Carderock Springs Historic District is a national historic district located at Bethesda, Montgomery County, Maryland.  The district encompasses 275 modernist houses located northwest of Bethesda. It was developed between 1962 and 1966, and was planned to take full advantage of the existing landscape and topography, with curvilinear streets and cul-de-sacs serving wooded, sloping properties.

It was listed on the National Register of Historic Places in 2008.

References

External links
 at Maryland Historical Trust
Boundary Map of the Carderock Springs Historic District, Montgomery County, at Maryland Historical Trust

Historic districts on the National Register of Historic Places in Maryland
Historic districts in Montgomery County, Maryland
Houses on the National Register of Historic Places in Maryland
Bethesda, Maryland
Houses in Montgomery County, Maryland
National Register of Historic Places in Montgomery County, Maryland